Raduha is a dispersed settlement on the southern slopes of Mount Raduha in the Municipality of Luče in northern Slovenia. The area belongs to the traditional region of Styria and is now included in the Savinja Statistical Region.

References

External links
Raduha on Geopedia
Raduha on Summitpost

Populated places in the Municipality of Luče